Breitling may refer to:
 Breitling (Warnow), a bay at the mouth of the River Warnow in the Baltic
 Breitling (Bay of Wismar), a bay between the mainland and the Baltic Sea island of Poel 
 Breitling SA, a Swiss watch manufacturer
 Breitlingsee, a lake in Brandenburg, Germany
 Breitling Jet Team, a civilian aerobatic display team in Europe
 Breitling Orbiter